Matthew Joshua Estrada (born October 20, 1988) is an American football safety who is currently a free agent. Estrada was most recently a member of the Toronto Argonauts of the Canadian Football League. He was signed by the Jacksonville Jaguars as an undrafted free agent in 2011. He played college football at Northern Arizona.

Professional career
High School:
A 2006 graduate of La Habra High School. Freeway League most valuable player. Division 9 Defensive Player of the Year. Chosen for all-state second-team. Recorded 119 tackles with four interceptions and four punt blocks. Played in the North-South Orange County All-Star game, earning North MVP honors. Also lettered in baseball, hitting .412 with a 35-game hit streak.

College Career:
2009: All-Big Sky first-team selection safety. Named most valuable defensive player, defensive backfield player of the year and outstanding junior at team banquet. Team captain. Started 10 games. Led the team with 78 tackles with a team-best 47 solo tackles. Ranked 15th in the Big Sky in tackles. Recorded at least seven tackles in six games and had 10 or more three times. Had a season-high 12 tackles at Sacramento State. Sat out final game due to Big Sky suspension. 2008: Saw action in 11 games. Tied for seventh on the team with 33 tackles. Recorded 2.5 sacks and four pass deflections. Had a season-high six tackles against Montana State. Had four or more tackles five times. Prior to NAU: Transfer from Fullerton Junior College. Played 2007 season for Gene Murphy. Named All-Mission second-team. Recorded 65 tackles with three interceptions with two kickoff returns for touchdowns. Redshirted 2006 season at Idaho under Dennis Erickson.

NFL
Estrada spent 13 weeks on the practice squad of the Jacksonville Jaguars of the National Football League.

CFL
On March 29, 2012 Matt Estrada signed with the Toronto Argonauts of the Canadian Football League. On June 20, 2012 Estrada was released by the Argonauts.

UFL
Played for the Omaha Nighthawks.

Los Angeles Kiss
On April 16, 2014, Estrada was assigned to the Los Angeles Kiss of the Arena Football League (AFL) but was quickly released due to injury.

References

External links
 Jacksonville Jaguars bio
 Toronto Argonauts bio
 Just Sports Stats

1988 births
Living people
American football safeties
Northern Arizona University alumni
Northern Arizona Lumberjacks football players
Jacksonville Jaguars players
Toronto Argonauts players
Omaha Nighthawks players
People from La Habra, California
Players of American football from California
Sportspeople from Orange County, California
Los Angeles Kiss players